Events from the year 1998 in Romania.

Events

March 
 30 March - Victor Ciorbea resigns from being prime minister. Gavril Dejeu replaces him as acting prime minister.

April 
 2 April - President Emil Constantinescu appoints Radu Vasile to be the new prime minister.
 15 April - The Parliament grants the investiture vote to the Radu Vasile Cabinet with 317 votes in favour and 124 against.
 17 April - The Vasile Cabinet takes its oath of office.

See also
 
Romania in the Eurovision Song Contest 1998
Romania at the 1998 Winter Olympics

References

External links